Frank Bernard Brett  (born 10 March 1899 – 21 July 1988) was an English footballer who played as a full back.

References

External links
MUFCInfo.com profile

1899 births
1988 deaths
English footballers
Tunbridge Wells F.C. players
Manchester United F.C. players
Northampton Town F.C. players
Aston Villa F.C. players
People from Kings Norton
Association football defenders